Julius Packiam is an Indian film score composer. His has composed for Ek Tha Tiger, Tiger Zinda Hai, Baaghi, Baaghi 2, Bajrangi Bhaijaan, Sultan and Bharat.

Filmography

References

External links 

Indian film score composers
Year of birth missing (living people)
Living people